Perşunari may refer to several villages in Romania:

 Perşunari,  a village in Cocorăştii Colţ Commune, Prahova County
 Perşunari, a village in Gura Vadului Commune, Prahova County